Thierry Gale (born May 1, 2002) is a Barbadian footballer who plays as a forward for Georgian club FC Dila Gori and the Barbados national team.

Early career
Gale played football at St Leonard’s Boys School in the Barbados Secondary Schools Football League (BSSFL). He led them to a national title in 2014 at the under-14 level. In 2016, he led the under-16 squad to a double (League and Knockout Cup). He finished as the league's top scorer.

He repeated the feat in 2017, scoring three goals (including the game-winner in the final) in the U-16 Knockout Cup, and leading the league with nine goals. That same year, he scored a brace on the final matchday of the U19 League to secure the league title. Two weeks later, he helped St Leonard's secure the double by scoring once in the U19 Knockout Cup final. For his performances, he was named BSSFL Player of the Week.

At the club level, Gale played with the prestigious school, Pro Shottas United. He was named their Player of the Year in 2014. In 2017, he led the under-15 squad to a first-place finish at the Guardian Group Youth Football Competition, capturing MVP honors as well.

Professional career
In August 2018, Gale trialled with Hungarian club Budapest Honvéd, along with national team captain Rashad Jules. In an interview with LoopTT, Jules called him "one of Barbados’ finest." Gale officially signed with Budapest Honvéd in October and joined their youth team.

In 2020 he signed his first professional contract, agreeing to a three-year deal with the 14-time champions. Soon thereafter, he made his professional debut on 21 August, coming on for Barna Kesztyűs during a 3–1 league defeat to MTK.

In July 2022 Gale moved to FC Dila Gori of Georgia’s Erovnuli Liga.

International career

Gale made his full debut for the senior national team in a 0–0 friendly draw against Bermuda on 25 March 2018, entering the match as a substitute for team captain Rashad Jules in the closing minutes. He was 15 years old. He scored his maiden international goal on 5 September 2019 against Saint Martin, a curving free-kick in front of his hometown crowd in Bridgetown to secure a 4–0 victory during the 2019–20 CONCACAF Nations League C.

Career statistics
.

International 

Scores and results list Barbados' goal tally first.

Personal life
His father, Dwayne Gale, won two Barbados Premier League titles with Paradise FC, and one with Notre Dame, in the early 2000s. Playing as a forward, he earned two caps with the Barbados national team and even enjoyed a stint with Galway in Ireland.

His favorite professional player is Cristiano Ronaldo.

References

External links
 
 
 

Living people
2002 births
Sportspeople from Bridgetown
Barbadian footballers
Barbados international footballers
Barbados under-20 international footballers
Barbados youth international footballers
Association football forwards
Budapest Honvéd FC players
FC Dila Gori players
Nemzeti Bajnokság I players
Erovnuli Liga players
Barbadian expatriate footballers
Barbadian expatriate sportspeople in Hungary
Expatriate footballers in Hungary
Barbadian expatriate sportspeople in Georgia (country)
Expatriate footballers in Georgia (country)